Erethizon is a genus of New World porcupine and the only one of its family to be found north of southern Mexico. The North American porcupine (Erethizon dorsatum) is the only extant species, but at least 4 extinct relatives are known, the oldest dating to the Late Pliocene. Porcupines entered North America during the Great American Interchange after the Isthmus of Panama rose 3 million years ago.

References

Rodent genera
Mammal genera with one living species
Taxa named by Frédéric Cuvier
Erethizontidae